Radixx is a travel technology company founded in 1993. Historically the provider for low-cost Carrier (LCC), hybrid, and retail-focused carriers, Radixx today supports all airline business models, in ticketed and tickletless capacity.  Sabre acquired Radixx in October 2019, as part of the technology company's entrance into the fast-growing LCC segment.

See also
 Passenger service system

External links

References

Airline tickets
Companies based in Florida
Information technology companies of the United States
Travel technology